Ypsolopha sordida is a moth of the family Ypsolophidae. It is known from southern China.

The length of the forewings is 10.8 mm.

Etymology
The specific name is derived from the Latin adjective sordidus (meaning dirty) and refers to the brown forewing intermixed with fuscous specks in the species.

References

Ypsolophidae
Moths of Asia